Dalston Square is a complex located just off Kingsland Road near Dalston Junction station in Dalston, part of the London Borough of Hackney, it includes approximately 500 homes, a library, public space, shops and restaurants.

Overview
The London Development Agency and the landowners – Hackney Council and Transport for London – developed the two sites at Dalston Lane South and Dalston Junction to transform the area. The development has been criticised by locals since a decaying Victorian theatre building, which had housed the pioneering music venue The Four Aces Club, was demolished to make way for the development.

Located in Dalston Square is the Dalston C. L. R. James Library, which was the first library to open in Hackney for 20 years.

References

Dalston
Squares in the London Borough of Hackney